This is a list of football (soccer) clubs in Austria.
For a complete list see :Category:Football clubs in Austria
 1. Wiener Neustädter SC (other)
 1. FC Vöcklabruck (Regional League Central)
 Absdorf (2. Landesliga East)
 Amaliendorf (1. Landesliga)
 Amstetten (1. Landesliga)
 USK Anif (Regional league West)
 Ardagger (1. Landesliga)
 ASK Baumgarten (Regional League East)
 ASK Edelsthal (other)
 ASK Köflach (Landesliga Styria)
 ASK Voitsberg (Regional League Central)
 Asperner Löwenteam    (Asperner Löwenteam)
 Austria Graz (other)
 Bad Vöslau (2. Landesliga East)
 FC Blau-Weiss Feldkirch (Regional League West)
 DFC Prag (defunct)
 DSG Union Perg (Upper Austrian League)
 Donawitzer SV Leoben (First League)
 Enzersfeld (2. Landesliga East)
 FAC Team für Wien (Regional League East)
 Favoritner AC (Viennese League)
 FC Blau-Weiss Linz (Upper Austrian League)
 FC Dynamo Meidling (Viennese 2nd group B)
 FC Gratkorn (First League)
 FC Hard (Regional League West)
 FC Höchst (Regional League West)
 FC Kärnten (First League)
 FC Kärnten Amateurs (Regional League Central)
 FC Kufstein (Regional League West)
 FC Lustenau 07 (First League)
 FC Red Bull Salzburg (Bundesliga)
 FC Liefering (First League)
 FC Swarovski Tirol (other)
 FC Tirol Innsbruck (defunct)
 FC Wacker Innsbruck (defunct)
 FC Wacker Tirol (Bundesliga)
 FC Waidhofen an der Ybbs (Regional League East)
 FC Wels (Regional League Central)
 FC Wien (other)
 FCK Welzenegg Amateure (Regional League Central)
 FCU Frankenfels (other)
 ATSV Fischamend (other)
 First Vienna FC (Regional League East)
 FK Austria Wien (Bundesliga)
 FK Austria Wien Amateure (First League)
 Floridsdorfer AC (other)
 FS Elektra (other)
 Götzendorf (2. Landesliga East)
 Liebherr Grazer AK (defunct)
 Grazer SC (other)
 Haitzendorf (1. Landesliga)
 Herzogenburg (1. Landesliga)
 Himberg (2. Landesliga East)
 Innsbrucker AC (Regional League West)
 Kapfenberger SV (First League)
 Kottingbrunn (1. Landesliga)
 Kremser SC (unknown)
 SV Donau Langenlebarn (2. Landesliga East)
 SV Langenrohr (1. Landesliga)
 LASK Linz (Bundesliga)
 Leobendorf (1. Landesliga)
 Leobersdorf (2. Landesliga East)
 Mistelbach (1. Landesliga)
 Neunkirchen (1. Landesliga)
 ÖMV Olympia (other)
 Ortmann (1. Landesliga)
 Polizei Feuerwehr (Regional League East)
 Post SV Wien (other)
 PSV Team Wien (unknown)
 Purkersdorf (2. Landesliga East)
 SK Rapid Wien Amateure (Regional League East)
 Retz (1. Landesliga)
 Reyersdorf (2. Landesliga East)
 Rot-Weiss Rankweil (Regional League West)
 SAK 1914 (Salzburger Liga)
 SAK Klagenfurt (Regional League Central)
 SC Austria Lustenau (First League)
 SC Austria Lustenau Amateurs (unknown)
 SK Bischofshofen (other)
 SC Bregenz (Regional League West)
 SC Eisenstadt (Regional League East)
 SV Gloggnitz (other)
 SC Hakoah Wien (defunct)
 SC Maccabi Wien (other)
 SC Neusiedl am See 1919 (Regional League East)
 SC Rheindorf Altach (Bundesliga)
 SC Ritzing (unknown)
 SC Schwanenstadt (First League)
 SC Wiener Neustadt (Bundesliga)
 SC Weiz (Regional League Central)
 SC Zwettl (Regional League East)
 SC-ESV Parndorf 1919 (First League)
 Schrems (1. Landesliga)
 SK Austria Kärnten (Bundesliga)
 SK Kundl (Regional League West)
 SK Rapid Wien (Bundesliga)
 SK St. Andrä (Regional League Central)
 SK Sturm Graz (Bundesliga)
 SK Sturm Graz Amateure (Regional League Central)
 SK Vienna Dragons (Landesliga East)
 SKN St. Pölten (Regional League East)
 Slovan HAC (other)
 Sollenau (2. Landesliga East)
 SPG Axams/Götzens (Regional League West)
 SPG Reichenau (Regional League West)
 SK Schwadorf (Regional League East)
 SV Stockerau (1. Landesliga)
 SV Allerheiligen (Regional League Central)
 SV Austria Salzburg (other)
 SV Bad Aussee (First League)
 FC Dornbirn 1913 (Regional League West)
 SV Esternberg (Upper Austrian League West)
 SV Feldkirchen (Regional League Central)
 SV Gmunden (Regional League Central)
 SV Grieskirchen (Regional League Central)
 SV Grödig (Regional League West)
 SV Hall (Regional League West)
 SV Horn (Regional League East)
 SV Mattersburg (Bundesliga)
 SV Mattersburg Amateurs (Regional League East)
 SV Ried (Bundesliga)
 SV Schwechat (Regional League East)
 SV Seekirchen 1945 (Regional League West)
 1. SC Simmering (other)
 SV Spittal an der Drau (Regional League Central)
 SV St. Veit an der Glan (other)
 SV Stadlau (other)
 SV Stickstoff Linz (other)
 SV Wienerberg (Regional League East)
 SV Würmla (Regional League East)
 SV Grenzland Bleiburg (Regional League Central)
 Theresienfeld (2. Landesliga East)
 TSV Hartberg (Regional League Central)
 Tulln (2. Landesliga East)
 WSG Radenthein (other)
 Union St. Florian (Regional League Central)
 USK Anif (Regional League West)
 VfB Admira Wacker Mödling (Bundesliga)
 VfB Admira Wacker Mödling II (Regional League East)
 VfB Hohenems (unknown)
 Vösendorf (1. Landesliga)
 Wiener AC (other)
 Wiener AF (other)
 Wiener Sport-Club (Regional League East)
 Wolkersdorf (2. Landesliga East)
 Wiener Neustadt (2. Landesliga East)
 WSG Wattens (Regional League West)
 Gaflenz (2. Landesliga (West)
 Großriedenthal (2. Landesliga West)
 Hofstetten (2. Landesliga West)
 Karlstetten (2. Landesliga West)
 Mank (2. Landesliga West)
 Neulengbach (2. Landesliga West)
 Oberndorf (2. Landesliga West)
 Oed/Z. (2. Landesliga West)
 Sieghartskirchen (2. Landesliga West)
 Spratzern (2. Landesliga West)
 St. Peter (2. Landesliga West)
 Sturm 19 St. Pölten (2. Landesliga West)
 SV Waidhofen an der Thaya (2. Landesliga West)
 Zwentendorf (2. Landesliga West)

Austria
 
clubs
Football